James Stanton V (1771–1829) and the Stanton family are the namesake of Stantonsburg, North Carolina.

Biography 

Stanton was born on August 23, 1771, in Northampton County, North Carolina, to James Stanton IV and Elizabeth Thweatt. He arrived at Stantonsburg, North Carolina, with his parents in 1782. In 1790, Stanton received a land grant in this area of 390 acres (1.6 km²).  He married Sally May, the daughter of Maj. Benjamin May and Mary Clara Tyson on August 4, 1795. They had 8 children.

Stanton died on February 23, 1829, in Stantonsburg, Wilson County, North Carolina.

References

1771 births
1829 deaths
People from Northampton County, North Carolina
People from Stantonsburg, North Carolina